Joanna Jędrzejczyk (born August 18, 1987) is a Polish former professional mixed martial artist and Muay Thai kickboxer. She has been called the greatest female strawweight mixed martial artist of all time, including by Daniel Cormier, who credited her with putting the weight class "on the map". Jędrzejczyk holds several records in the Ultimate Fighting Championship (UFC), where she is a former UFC Women's Strawweight Champion, including most successful strawweight title defenses (5), most consecutive wins at strawweight (8), and is the first Polish champion and first female European champion.

After discovering Muay Thai as a teenager, Jędrzejczyk went on to earn six medals (five gold) at the IFMA World Muaythai Championships and held several different championship titles with promotions such as World Kickboxing Network and World Muaythai Council. Switching to mixed martial arts (MMA) in May 2012, Jędrzejczyk went undefeated in her first nine fights and won the UFC Women's Strawweight Championship in March 2015 after defeating Carla Esparza at UFC 185. Over the next two years, she continued her undefeated streak with five successful title defenses against opponents such as Jessica Penne, Cláudia Gadelha, and Jéssica Andrade. Jędrzejczyk suffered the first loss of her MMA career when she lost the championship to Rose Namajunas in November 2017. After losing a rematch with Namajunas, Jędrzejczyk defeated Tecia Torres before briefly returning to flyweight in an unsuccessful attempt to capture the vacant UFC Women's Flyweight Championship against Valentina Shevchenko in December 2018. Following a strawweight win over Michelle Waterson, Jędrzejczyk faced new strawweight champion Zhang Weili at UFC 248 in March 2020. Jędrzejczyk lost by split decision in what was called the greatest fight in women's MMA history by many pundits. Following a two-year layoff, Jędrzejczyk retired from mixed martial arts in June 2022 after losing a rematch against Zhang at UFC 275.

Muay Thai and kickboxing
Jędrzejczyk discovered Muay Thai when she was 16, while taking up fitness, which eventually led her to compete in national and European tournaments. Jędrzejczyk competed in Muay Thai and kickboxing for 10 years, winning over 60 matches. Her amateur Muay Thai accomplishments include six IFMA world medals (five gold, one silver) and four IFMA European championships with a record of 37 wins and 3 losses. During her professional career Jędrzejczyk won five world titles including the WKN World Championship, J Girls Championship, WBKF Championship, WKF European Championship, and the WMC Championship. Her professional record is 27–3.

Mixed martial arts

Early career
Jędrzejczyk made her professional debut in mixed martial arts (MMA) on May 19, 2012, at SFT - MMA Fight Night Diva SPA against Sylwia Juskiewicz, winning via unanimous decision. On December 8, 2012, at MFC 5 she defeated Lily Kazak by submission via rear naked choke. On June 20, 2013, at Battle of Moscow 12 she defeated the then #1 Russian WMMA flyweight fighter Julia Berezikova via unanimous decision.

By July 2013, Jędrzejczyk was the #7 women's flyweight fighter in the world by Fight Matrix.

On June 7, 2014, at Cage Warriors Fighting Championship 69 she defeated Rosi Sexton via knockout in the second round.

Ultimate Fighting Championship
Jędrzejczyk officially signed with the Ultimate Fighting Championship (UFC) in July 2014. She made her promotional debut, now fighting as a strawweight, on July 26, 2014, at UFC on Fox: Lawler vs. Brown against Juliana Lima. She won the fight via unanimous decision.

Jędrzejczyk next faced undefeated strawweight top contender Cláudia Gadelha on December 13, 2014, at UFC on Fox 13. She won the fight via split decision. The judges' decision was met with much controversy as the majority of the MMA media scored the bout in favor of Gadelha.

Strawweight Champion
Jędrzejczyk faced Carla Esparza for the UFC Strawweight Championship on March 14, 2015, at UFC 185. Jędrzejczyk won the one-sided bout via TKO in the second round, becoming the first UFC title-holder from Poland and first female European UFC champion. Subsequently, Jędrzejczyk won a Performance of the Night bonus.

Jędrzejczyk's first title defense was against Jessica Penne on June 20, 2015, at UFC Fight Night: Jędrzejczyk vs. Penne in Berlin, Germany. She successfully defended the title against Penne, defeating her in the third round via TKO following a flurry of punches and a knee against the cage. Both participants were awarded Fight of the Night honors. Jędrzejczyk later underwent surgery to repair a fractured thumb incurred during the fight.

In her second title defense, Jędrzejczyk faced Valérie Létourneau on November 15, 2015, in the co-main event at UFC 193. She won the fight by unanimous decision to retain her title. The 220 significant strikes landed by Jędrzejczyk were the most ever in a championship fight. 70 leg kicks were landed by Jędrzejczyk, the most in UFC history. The previous record was 68, set by Carlos Condit against Nick Diaz at UFC 143.

In early 2016, the UFC announced that Jędrzejczyk would be one of the coaches, opposite former opponent Cláudia Gadelha on The Ultimate Fighter 23. A rematch between the two took place on July 8, 2016, at The Ultimate Fighter 23 Finale in the MGM Grand Garden Arena in Las Vegas, Nevada. She won the fight via unanimous decision. Both participants were awarded Fight of the Night for their performance.

Jędrzejczyk successfully defended her title for the 4th consecutive time by defeating fellow Pole Karolina Kowalkiewicz by unanimous decision on November 12, 2016, at UFC 205 in Madison Square Garden, the first event the promotion had held in the historic arena.

Jędrzejczyk faced Jéssica Andrade on May 13, 2017, at UFC 211. She won the fight via unanimous decision, and successfully defended her title for the fifth consecutive time. Jędrzejczyk landed the most significant strikes in UFC championship history (225), had the highest significant strike differential in UFC championship history (142), and broke her previous record for most leg kicks thrown in a single fight (75).

For her sixth title defense, Jędrzejczyk faced Rose Namajunas at UFC 217 at Madison Square Garden in New York on November 4, 2017. She lost the bout via KO (punches) in the first round, marking her first professional loss in mixed martial arts competition.

Post-championship
A title fight rematch between Namajunas and Jędrzejczyk took place on April 7, 2018, at UFC 223. She lost the fight via unanimous decision.

Jędrzejczyk faced Tecia Torres on July 28, 2018, at UFC on Fox 30. She won the fight via unanimous decision.

Return to Flyweight
On September 20, 2018, it was announced that Jędrzejczyk was expected to return to flyweight to face Valentina Shevchenko on December 8, 2018, at UFC 231 for the vacant UFC Women's Flyweight Championship. Due to UFC 230 being in need of a main event, Shevchenko was booked against Sijara Eubanks. After the UFC announced Cormier vs. Lewis on October 9, 2018, UFC confirmed the bout between Shevchenko and Eubanks was canceled and that Jędrzejczyk would again fight for the title against Shevchenko in the co-main event at UFC 231. Jędrzejczyk lost the fight via a unanimous decision.

Return to Strawweight
Jędrzejczyk faced Michelle Waterson on October 12, 2019, at UFC on ESPN+ 19. Per news reports, Jędrzejczyk had informed the UFC that she might not be able to make the Strawweight limit; however, she weighed in at 115.5 pounds. She won the fight via unanimous decision.

Jędrzejczyk faced Zhang Weili for UFC Women's Strawweight Championship on March 7, 2020, at UFC 248. She lost the fight via split decision. This fight earned her the Fight of the Night award, and was considered by many pundits as the greatest fight in women's MMA history.

A rematch between Jędrzejczyk and Zhang took place on June 11, 2022 at UFC 275. Jędrzejczyk lost the fight after getting knocked out with a spinning backfist in the second round. In her post-fight interview, Jędrzejczyk announced her retirement from mixed martial arts, saying, "It's been 20 years. I'm turning 35 this year. I want to be a mom. I want to be a businesswoman. I've been training two decades, more than half of my life. I appreciate you all. I love you guys."

Fighting style and coaches
A decorated kickboxer, Jędrzejczyk is known for precise and calculated striking. She employs a sprawl-and-brawl strategy in MMA fighting. While standing with opponents, she constantly varies between high punches and body shots, also utilizing knees, elbows, and high front kicks. She also uses a flurry of strikes just to confuse the opponent before landing a solid strike, much akin to Chuck Liddell. SportsJoe.ie MMA journalist Darragh Murphy summed up her fighting style: "Her technique has the right combination of sublimity and relentlessness, expressing one's typically violent art through beauty, the perfect storm."

Jędrzejczyk is soft-spoken and has a calm and endearing personality with fans. However, she often employs the use of trash-talk against her opponents before fights, and her fights have been known to be violent and bloody. UFC president Dana White has praised her stating "She is so bad ass... pound-for-pound [she is the] best female fighter on Earth... Her killer instinct is ridiculous." MMA media have called Jędrzejczyk "must-see TV".

Jędrzejczyk has been praised for her elite level sprawl-and-brawl strategy. Fightland striking analyst Jack Slack has written that "she's being likened to Chuck Liddell, and that is a pretty solid way to describe her...while she has an undoubtedly better technical striking game than Liddell". BloodyElbow.com striking analyst Connor Ruebusch has written "Distance, angles, and damage. These are the key ingredients of successful takedown defense, and the elements that make Joanna Jędrzejczyk and José Aldo such masterful strikers." The Washington Post striking analyst Patrick Wyman wrote that "sound fundamentals fuel the best fighters in the world, and nobody has better mastered the bread and butter of footwork and distance management than Aldo and Jedrzejczyk". Foxsports.com striking analyst Jason Parillo has stated that "Joanna's MMA boxing is remarkable. It's second to none".

Since her training camp for UFC 205, Jędrzejczyk has trained at American Top Team in Coconut Creek, Florida.

Her strength and conditioning coach is Phil Daru. In 2021, Jędrzejczyk was promoted to blue belt in Brazilian jiu-jitsu after training in the gi.

Personal life
Jędrzejczyk is Catholic and prays with a rosary before entering the ring or Octagon.

She was the fiancée of former Polish football player Przemysław Buta. In a 2019 interview, she cited "some difficulties" in her personal life for "almost two years," confirming that she is no longer engaged to Buta.

Filmography

Film

Championships and accomplishments

Mixed martial arts
Ultimate Fighting Championship
UFC Women's Strawweight Championship (one time)
Five successful title defenses
Tied (with Amanda Nunes) for the most title fights in UFC women's divisions (10)
First Polish-born champion in UFC history
Performance of the Night (one time) vs. Carla Esparza
Fight of the Night (three times) 
Tied (Carla Esparza) for most wins in UFC Women's Strawweight history (10)
Most title bouts in UFC Women's Strawweight history (9)
Most wins in title bouts in UFC Women's Strawweight history (6)
Most consecutive wins in UFC Women's Strawweight history (8)
Tied (Angela Hill), Tecia Torres) for most unanimous decision wins in UFC Women's Strawweight history (6)
Highest significant strike differential in UFC championship history (+142 vs. Jéssica Andrade)
2nd-highest significant strike differential in UFC championship history (+121 vs. Karolina Kowalkiewicz)
3rd-highest significant strike differential in UFC championship history (+117 vs. Valérie Létourneau)
4th-highest significant strike differential in UFC championship history (+113 vs. Cláudia Gadelha)
Highest significant strikes thrown in a UFC championship fight (+225 vs. Jéssica Andrade)
2nd-highest significant strikes thrown in a UFC championship fight (+220 vs. Valérie Létourneau)
Most leg kicks in a fight in UFC history (+78 vs Michelle Waterson)
2nd-most leg kicks in a fight in UFC history (+75 vs Jéssica Andrade)
First Polish UFC Champion
First female European UFC Champion
Third European UFC Champion
2020 Fight of the Year vs. Zhang Weili
2020 UFC President's Choice Fight of the Year vs. Zhang Weili
Women's MMA Press Awards
2014 Strawweight of the Year
Yahoo! Sports
2015 Best Fighter of the Half-Year
Fight Matrix
2015 Female Fighter of the Year
MMAjunkie.com
2015 Female Fighter of the Year
2016 July Fight of the Month vs. Cláudia Gadelha
2020 March Fight of the Month vs. Zhang Weili
2020 Fight of the Year vs. Zhang Weili
Fightbooth.com
2015 Lady Violence Award
Sherdog.com
2015 All-Violence First Team
2020 Fight of the Year vs. Zhang Weili
 World MMA Awards
 2019 – July 2020 Fight of the Year vs. Zhang Weili at UFC 248
Wrestling Observer Newsletter
2020 MMA Match of the Year vs. Zhang Weili
MMA Fighting
2020 Fight of the Year  vs. Zhang Weili
The Athletic
2020 Fight of the Year vs. Zhang Weili
Bleacher Report
2020 Fight of the Year vs. Zhang Weili
Cageside Press
2020 Fight of the Year vs. Zhang Weili
BT Sport
2020 Fight of the Year vs. Zhang Weili
MMA Weekly
2020 Fight of the Year vs. Zhang Weili
Combat Press
2020 Fight of the Year vs. Zhang Weili

Kickboxing
J-Girls Kickboxing Federation
2009 J-Girls World Featherweight Champion
World Budokai Federation
 2013 WBKF Pro Title 
World Kickboxing Federation
 2010 WKF European Champion

Muay Thai
IFMA World Championships
2013  -57 kg
2012  -57 kg
2011  -57 kg
2009  -57 kg
2008  -57 kg
IFMA European Championships
3x IFMA European Champion (2008, 2012)
World Muaythai Council
WMC/EMF European Champion (one time)
World Kickboxing Network
 2010 WKN Muay Thai World -57 kg Champion (one time)

Mixed martial arts record

|-
|Loss
|align=center|16–5
|Zhang Weili
|KO (spinning backfist)
|UFC 275
|
|align=center|2
|align=center|2:28
|Kallang, Singapore
|
|-
|Loss
|align=center|16–4
|Zhang Weili
|Decision (split)
|UFC 248
|
|align=center|5
|align=center|5:00
|Las Vegas, Nevada, United States
|
|-
|Win
|align=center|16–3
|Michelle Waterson
|Decision (unanimous)
|UFC Fight Night: Joanna vs. Waterson
|
|align=center|5
|align=center|5:00
|Tampa, Florida, United States
|
|-
|Loss
|align=center|15–3
|Valentina Shevchenko
|Decision (unanimous)
|UFC 231
|
|align=center|5
|align=center|5:00
|Toronto, Ontario, Canada
|
|-
|Win
|align=center|15–2
|Tecia Torres
|Decision (unanimous)
|UFC on Fox: Alvarez vs. Poirier 2
|
|align=center|3
|align=center|5:00
|Calgary, Alberta, Canada
|
|-
|Loss
|align=center|14–2
|Rose Namajunas
|Decision (unanimous)
|UFC 223
|
|align=center|5
|align=center|5:00
|Brooklyn, New York, United States
|
|-
|Loss
|align=center|14–1
|Rose Namajunas
|TKO (punches) 
|UFC 217
|
|align=center|1
|align=center|3:03
|New York City, New York, United States
|
|-
|Win
|align=center|14–0
|Jéssica Andrade
|Decision (unanimous)
|UFC 211
|
|align=center|5
|align=center|5:00
|Dallas, Texas, United States
|
|-
|Win
|align=center|13–0
|Karolina Kowalkiewicz
|Decision (unanimous)
|UFC 205
|
|align=center|5
|align=center|5:00
|New York City, New York, United States
|
|-
|Win
|align=center|12–0
|Cláudia Gadelha
|Decision (unanimous)
|The Ultimate Fighter: Team Joanna vs. Team Cláudia Finale
|
|align=center|5
|align=center|5:00
|Las Vegas, Nevada, United States
|
|-
|Win
|align=center|11–0
|Valérie Létourneau
|Decision (unanimous)
|UFC 193
|
|align=center|5
|align=center|5:00
|Melbourne, Victoria, Australia
|
|-
|Win
|align=center|10–0
|Jessica Penne
|TKO (punches and knee)
|UFC Fight Night: Jędrzejczyk vs. Penne
|
|align=center|3
|align=center|4:22
|Berlin, Germany
|
|-
|Win
|align=center|9–0
|Carla Esparza
|TKO (punches)
|UFC 185
|
|align=center|2
|align=center|4:17
|Dallas, Texas, United States
|
|-
|Win
|align=center|8–0
|Cláudia Gadelha
|Decision (split)
|UFC on Fox: dos Santos vs. Miocic
|
|align=center|3
|align=center|5:00
|Phoenix, Arizona, United States
|
|-
|Win
|align=center|7–0
|Juliana Lima
|Decision (unanimous)
|UFC on Fox: Lawler vs. Brown
|
|align=center|3
|align=center|5:00
|San Jose, California, United States
|
|-
|Win
|align=center|6–0
|Rosi Sexton
|KO (punch)
|CWFC 69: Super Saturday
|
|align=center|2
|align=center|2:36
|London, England
|
|-
|Win
|align=center|5–0
|Karla Benitez
|Decision (unanimous)
|WAM: Fabinski vs. Herb
|
|align=center|3
|align=center|5:00
|Warsaw, Poland
|
|-
|Win
|align=center|4–0
|Julia Berezikova
|Decision (unanimous)
|Fight Nights: Battle of Moscow 12
|
|align=center|2
|align=center|5:00
|Moscow, Russia
|
|-
|Win
|align=center|3–0
|Kate Jackson
|TKO (doctor stoppage)
|PLMMA 17 Extra: Warmia Heroes
|
|align=center|2
|align=center|5:00
|Olsztyn, Poland
|
|-
|Win
|align=center|2–0
|Lily Kazak
|Submission (rear-naked choke)
|Makowski FC 5
|
|align=center|1
|align=center|3:22
|Nowa Sol, Poland
|
|-
|Win
|align=center|1–0
|Sylwia Juśkiewicz
|Decision (unanimous)
|SFT: MMA Diva Fight Night SPA
|
|align=center|2
|align=center|5:00
|Kolobrzeg, Poland
|
|-

|-
|Win
|align=center|2–0
|Karolina Kowalkiewicz
|Submission (rear-naked choke)
|Amatorska Liga MMA 18
|
|align=center|1
|align=center|4:18
|Sochaczew, Poland
|
|-
|Win
|align=center|1–0
|Paulina Suska
|Decision (unanimous)
|Amatorska Liga MMA 18
|
|align=center|1
|align=center|5:00
|Sochaczew, Poland
|
|-

Pay-per-view bouts

Muay Thai & Kickboxing record (incomplete)

|- style="background:#fbb;"
|2013-11-07
| Loss
| style="text-align:left" |  Duannapa Mor Rattanapundit
|Muay Thai Angels
| Bangkok, Thailand
| Decision
| 3
| 3:00
|- style="background:#cfc;"
|2013-10-02
|Win
| style="text-align:left" |  Sandra Sevilla
|Muay Thai Angels
| Bangkok, Thailand
|Decision
| 3
| 3:00

|- style="background:#cfc;"
|2013-09-07
|Win
| style="text-align:left" |  Lisa Schewe
|
| Germany
|Decision
| 3
| 3:00

|- style="background:#cfc;"
|2012-11-23
|Win
| style="text-align:left" |  Ayano Oishi
| Hoost Cup Spirit 2
| Nagoya, Japan
|Ext.R Decision (Unanimous)
| 4
| 3:00

|- style="background:#fbb;"
|2011-11-26
| Loss
| style="text-align:left" |  Ekaterina Vandaryeva
|Big-8 WKN World Grand Prix
| Minsk, Belarus
| Decision
| 5
| 3:00
|-
! style=background:white colspan=9 |
|- style="background:#cfc;"
|2011-05-11
|Win
| style="text-align:left" |  Marta Chojnoska
|Iron Fist 4
| Szczecin, Poland
|Decision
| 5
| 3:00
|-
|- style="background:#cfc;"
|2010-09-12
|Win
| style="text-align:left" |  Alla Ivashkevich
|WKN Belarus Big 8 Tournament
| Minsk, Belarus
|Decision 
| 5
| 3:00
|-
! style=background:white colspan=9 |
|-
|- style="background:#fbb;"
|2010-06-19
| Loss
| style="text-align:left" |  Amanda Kelly
|Lady Killers 4
| Manchester, England
|Decision
| 5
| 3:00
|- style="background:#cfc;"
|2010-04-11
|Win
| style="text-align:left" |  Mariela Kruse
|
| Netherlands
|Points
| 3
| 3:00
|- style="background:#cfc;"
|2009-12-20
|Win
| style="text-align:left" |  Satoko Sasaki
|J-GIRLS Final Stage 2009
| Tokyo, Japan
|Decision (Unanimous)
| 3
| 3:00
|-
! style=background:white colspan=9 |

|- style="background:#cfc;"
|2009-08-29
|Win
| style="text-align:left" |  Titiana van Polanen
|Fighting with the Stars
| Paramaribo, Suriname
|Decision
| 3
| 3:00
|- style="background:#cfc;"
|2008-12-21
|Win
| style="text-align:left" |  Aleide Lawant
|
| Amsterdam, Netherlands
|Decision
| 3
| 3:00
|-
| colspan=9 | Legend:    

|-  bgcolor="#cfc"
| 2012-09-12 || Win ||align=left| Katia Semail || I.F.M.A. World Championship Tournament 2012, Finals -57 kg || Saint Petersburg, Russia || Decision || 4 || 2:00
|-
! style=background:white colspan=9 |

|-  bgcolor="#cfc"
| 2012-09-11 || Win ||align=left| Emma Thyni || I.F.M.A. World Championship Tournament 2012, Semi-finals -57 kg || Saint Petersburg, Russia || N/A || N/A || N/A

|-  bgcolor="#cfc"
| 2012-09-10 || Win ||align=left| Janna Vaughan || I.F.M.A. World Championship Tournament 2012, Quarter Finals -57 kg || Saint Petersburg, Russia || N/A || N/A || N/A

|-  bgcolor="#cfc"
| 2012-09-08 || Win ||align=left| Diana Jakovleva|| I.F.M.A. World Championship Tournament 2012, First Round -57 kg || Saint Petersburg, Russia || N/A || N/A || N/A

|-  bgcolor="#cfc"
| 2012-05-? || Win ||align=left| Diana Jakovleva|| E.M.F. European Championship Tournament 2012, Finals -60 kg || Antalya, Turkey || Decision || 4 || 2:00
|-
! style=background:white colspan=9 |

|-  bgcolor="#cfc"
| 2011-09-26 || Win ||align=left| Maria Olsson || I.F.M.A. World Championship Tournament 2011, Finals -57 kg || Tashkent, Uzbekistan || Decision || 4 || 2:00
|-
! style=background:white colspan=9 |

|-  bgcolor="#cfc"
| 2011-09-24 || Win ||align=left| Ekatarina Vandaryeva || I.F.M.A. World Championship Tournament 2011, Semi-finals -57 kg || Tashkent, Uzbekistan || Decision || 4 || 2:00

|-  bgcolor="#cfc"
| 2011-09-23 || Win ||align=left| Diana Jakovleva || I.F.M.A. World Championship Tournament 2011, Quarter Finals -57 kg || Tashkent, Uzbekistan || Decision || 4 || 2:00

|-  bgcolor="#cfc"
| 2009-12-?|| Win||align=left| Anna Zucchelli || I.F.M.A. World Championship Tournament 2009, Finals -57 kg || Bangkok, Thailand || N/A || N/A || N/A
|-
! style=background:white colspan=9 |

|-  bgcolor="#fbb"
| 2008-09-? || Loss ||align=left| Valentina Shevchenko || I.F.M.A. World Championship Tournament 2008, Finals -57 kg || Busan, South Korea || Decision || 3 || 3:00
|-
! style=background:white colspan=9 |

|-  bgcolor="#fbb"
| 2007-11-29 || Loss ||align=left| Valentina Shevchenko || I.F.M.A. World Championship Tournament 2007, Quarter Finals -57 kg || Bangkok, Thailand || Decision || 4 || 2:00

|-  bgcolor="#fbb"
| 2006-05-31 || Loss ||align=left| Valentina Shevchenko || I.F.M.A. World Championship Tournament 2006, Quarter Finals -57 kg || Bangkok, Thailand || Decision || 3 || 3:00

|-
| colspan=9 | Legend:

See also
List of female mixed martial artists
List of UFC champions

References

External links

Official YouTube Channel
Official Instagram
Official Snapchat

1987 births
Bantamweight kickboxers
Polish female kickboxers
Female Muay Thai practitioners
Flyweight mixed martial artists
Mixed martial artists utilizing kickboxing
Mixed martial artists utilizing Muay Thai
Mixed martial artists utilizing Brazilian jiu-jitsu
Living people
Polish female mixed martial artists
Polish Muay Thai practitioners
Polish practitioners of Brazilian jiu-jitsu
Female Brazilian jiu-jitsu practitioners
Sportspeople from Olsztyn
Strawweight mixed martial artists
Ultimate Fighting Championship champions
Polish Roman Catholics
Featherweight kickboxers
Ultimate Fighting Championship female fighters
Polish film actresses
Twin sportspeople
Kickboxing champions